William Leslie McJannet (born 2 August 1961) is a Scottish former footballer who made 193 appearances in the Football League playing as a right back for Mansfield Town, Scarborough and Darlington between 1979 and 1992. He remained with Darlington for their 1989–90 Football Conference title-winning season, and also played non-league football for clubs including King's Lynn, Burton Albion, Matlock Town and Boston United.

He went on to manage in non-league football, taking charge of Sutton Town, Glapwell and Carlton Town.

References

1961 births
Living people
People from Cumnock
Scottish footballers
Association football defenders
Mansfield Town F.C. players
King's Lynn F.C. players
Burton Albion F.C. players
Matlock Town F.C. players
Scarborough F.C. players
Darlington F.C. players
Boston United F.C. players
English Football League players
Northern Premier League players
Southern Football League players
National League (English football) players
Scottish football managers
Sutton Town A.F.C. managers
Glapwell F.C. managers
Carlton Town F.C. managers
Footballers from East Ayrshire